All My Life (translit. Toul Omry), is a 2008 Egyptian film by Maher Sabry. It is noted as being the first film to handle the subject of male homosexuality and the status of homosexuals in Egypt. While a work of fiction, Sabry made efforts to use real-life influences from his own experiences to the 2001 arrests of the Cairo 52 to keep the portrayal of conditions for homosexuals in Egypt accurate.

Plot

The film's plot revolves around the life of Rami, a 26-year-old homosexual, his life in Cairo, and his experiences with his friends and neighbors.

Cast and characters
Mazen Nassar as Rami - a gay dance student in Cairo
Ayman as  Walid - Rami's lover who leaves him to marry a woman
Jwana as Dalia - Rami's friend, a student who plans to study abroad to escape the conservative atmosphere in Egypt
Louay as Kareem - Rami's friend, a doctor active in the underground gay scene
Julian Gonzalez Esparza as Ahmad - Rami's neighbor, a devout Muslim man with an inconvenient passion for women
Mehammed Amadeus as Mina - Rami's teenage neighbor who lives a closeted life under his strict Christian mother's roof
Maged as Atef - a poor waiter who becomes a love interest to Rami

Other actors

Janaan Attia ... Nurse Latifa
Munir Bayyari ... Hany
Monica Berini ... Office Worker
Travis Creston ...  Tourist
Habeeb El-Deb ...  Prosecutor
Youssef El-Shareif ...  Ashraf
Sarah Enany ...  Nurse Safaa / Opera Singer
Hala Fauzi ...  Belly Dancer
Bassam Kassab ...  Hatem
Ayman Kozman ...  Policeman
Nabila Mango ...  Mina's mother
Jamal Mavrikios ...  Mazen's colleague
Amar Puri ...  Amar
Mykha Ram ...  Mostafa
Ashraf Sewailam ...  Rami (voice)
Wedad ...  Khadra
Christopher White ...  Mark
Hesham El-Tahawi ...  TV actor one
Naglaa Younis ...  TV actress two
Seham Saneya Adelsalam ...  TV actress three

Release
The film premiered at Frameline in San Francisco in June 2008.

Reactions
While previously in Egyptian film, gay characters had visibility in general in minor roles, as in The Bathhouse of Malatily (1973), Alexandria … Why? (1978), Mendiants et Orgueilleux (1991), Marcides (1993) and, recently, The Yacoubian Building (2007), All My Life was the first all-gay film to be released.

Sheikh Nasr Faryd Wasel, ex-Mufti of Egypt, called for the destruction of the film, stating "these films are the gateway to debauchery, to committing that forbidden by Allah and propagate deviant social behaviors". Though he expressed desire for the film to be suppressed and held from film festivals, it was screened at various film festivals around the world in such cities as San Francisco, New York, Athens, Melbourne, Sydney, Bangalore and Ljubljana.

Dr. Zeyn il-Abedyn, Egypt's Anti-AIDS Program Director, said that the film was "a painful blow to all our efforts to combat the spread of HIV." In an interview with Arabiya.net, he stated that "Unnatural sexual practices are second only to blood transfusions as probable causes for infection with this disease", which the Egyptian Underground Film society replied is a "clear implication that HIV/AIDS only infect male homosexuals." The EUFS continued, stating: "By implying this, he completely ignores scientific fact; statistics have shown that AIDS is also widespread among heterosexuals and children. Instead of raising public awareness about safe sex, such statements are misleading and create a false sense of security; they create a popular belief that HIV/AIDS only infects a certain class of people, leading to the illusion of safety which, in turn, leads to the spread of the disease."

Regarding responses of conservative Muslim figures, Maher Sabry said "I’m not surprised that this happened. It was expected, yet it’s still painful to me, because it’s an indication of just how backward we’ve become. We’re now living in an age of cultural regression, an age where dissidents, presidential candidates and religious minorities are thrown into jail. We claim to be emulating Islamic civilization; but if the people who built that civilization were alive today, there would have been fatwas pronounced against them, and their books and other works would have been burned."

Awards
In 2011, All My Life earned the Audience Award in the category of Narrative Feature at the 7th FACE à FACE film festival. The festival is based in St Etienne, France, with the mission to promote positive attitudes towards homosexuality through art and culture.

See also

 Cinema of Egypt
 Pleasure and Suffering

References

Further reading
 Mustapha, Tariq (طارق مصطفي). "مشاكل المثليين في فيلم سينماءى على أغنية عبد الوهاد." (." Rose el Yousef. - Article about the film

External links
 
 

2000s Arabic-language films
Egyptian LGBT-related films
LGBT-related drama films
2008 LGBT-related films
Gay-related films
Egyptian drama films